List of alien races in DC Comics is a list of fictional extraterrestrial races that have appeared in comic book titles published by DC Comics, as well as properties from other media that are listed below, with brief descriptions and accompanying citations.

Overview
There are countless different extraterrestrial races in the DC Comics universe. The vast majority are humanoid in structure.

United Planets

The United Planets is a fictional governing body which is active starting in the 21st century all the way to the 31st Century. The planets of the Solar System and Htrae are known members alongside the artificial planet-sized satellites, the buffer planets that were seeded by Mon-El, and the neighboring empires.

0-9

5th Dimensional Imps
Zrfff is the homeworld of all 5th Dimensional Imps, including Mister Mxyzptlk, Miss Gsptlsnz, Vyndktvx, Brpxz, Mister Genie (Genro), Quisp, Bat-Mite, Kcid Nosyarg (Larry), Zook, Gazook, and Mopee.

5th Dimensional Imps in other media
The 5th Dimensional Imps appear in Supergirl.

A

Adaptoids
The Adaptoids were blob-like creatures in the vicinity of the star Arcturus that traveled to Earth-One in attempt to wipe out the human race. Able to adapt to any threat, they were defeated by the Justice League when they were exposed to the Thanagarian equalizing disease.

Aellans
The Aellans are the yellow-skinned reptilian humanoid peoples of Aello (Stormswift), Demonia, Harpis and Doc of Aello were all members of the Omega Men.

Alien Invaders
The Alien Invaders are the nameless primary antagonists of Armageddon: The Alien Agenda.

Almeraci
The Almeraci are a humanoid race of technologically advanced warriors with psionic abilities similar to the Euphorix. The Almeraci are ruled by the House of the Blood Royale, a matriarchy of superpowered monarchs who maintain their bloodline and psionic status through selective breeding. The Almeraci choose mates through ceremonial gladiatorial competitions; whichever male can defeat a prospective female in battle earns her hand in marriage. This species is represented by Maxima - Queen of Almerac - as well as her handmaiden Sazu and her onetime betrothed Ultraa.

Aloi
The Aloi are blue-skinned aliens with ridged foreheads. The Aloi are at war with the Margoi over a device known as the "Grayl". They were represented by Tumlat.

Alstairans
The Alstairans of Alstair are one of four technologically advanced and constantly at war spacefaring races native to the Antares system. The most well known Alstairan is their ruler, the alien plant elemental known as Hyathis. Alstairans are plantlike humanoids with leaves instead of hair.

Anasazi
The Anasazi in the DC Comics Universe are metahumans who were resettled to planet Starhaven, represented by Dawnstar.

Andromedans
The Andromedans of the Andromeda Galaxy are a race of superhumans similar to Kryptonians and Daxamites. They have red hair, albino skin and blue eyes. One of the Andromedans named Karb-Brak was exiled to Earth because he developed an allergy to superhuman metabolisms, he took the human identity of construction worker Andrew Meda. Superman and Vartox eventually cure Karb-Brak and return him to his homeworld.

Angtuans
The Angtuans are inhabitants of the planet Angtu, a world with a thick, noxious atmosphere. Angtu was ultimately destroyed in the 30th century by the mutated native Mano.

Anunnake
The Anunnake are reptilian aliens who claim to have killed off the dinosaurs; they are also known as the Hunter/Gatherers.

Anndrann
The Anndrann are green-skinned military geniuses from Anndranna who were later banished to Bellatrix and are famed for their weapons of war. Iron has a deleterious effect on their cognitive abilities.

Appellaxians
The Appellaxians of Appellax are a race of technologically advanced energy aliens from the planet Appellax with the ability to create powerful artificial host bodies for their minds. The seven Appellaxians that invaded created bodies that were named Golden Roc (a golden bird-like monster), Wood King (a humanoid wood monster who had power over wood), Stone-God (a humanoid rock monster that can shoot Kryptonite beams from its eyes), Crystal Creature (a humanoid crystal monster who can fire diamond shards), Fire-Lord (a humanoid fire monster with pyrokinesis), Glass-Man (a humanoid glass monster with energy projection), and Mercury Monster (a living pool of mercury). Each of them can turn other beings into the beings of their respectful elements. It is because of them that the Justice League first came together. The Appellaxians were defeated by the Justice League.

Appellaxians in other media
The Appellaxians appear in Young Justice. In the episode "Alienated", the bodies of the Appellaxians are displayed in the Hall of Justice. In "Salvage", Bruno Mannheim used an Apokoliptan device to combine the residual energy in the Appellaxian husks of Golden Roc, Wood God, Stone God, Crystal Creature, and Mercury Monster and combine them into an Appellaxian Golem which he planned to have it be an enforcer for Intergang. When it arrived in Arlington, the Appellaxian Golem destroyed the remote control that Bruno Mannheim was using to control it and went on a rampage into a nuclear power plant. When Superboy and Blue Beetle speak with it upon being persuaded to stand down, the Appellaxian Golem was destroyed by a sonic blast from Black Beetle.

Aipitons
The Aipitons are the presumed name of a species of small flying insects of the planet Apaiton. They are represented by the deceased Green Lantern Bzzd.

Aquoids
The Aquoids are natives of planet Beltair IV.

Aranes
The Aranes of Arane II are a race of light blue-skinned, white-haired humanoids, with tiny blue protruding horns on their foreheads. Rolind Siepur of Arane II is a member of the Dark Circle.

Ardenans
The Ardenans are the presumed name of a sentient race of humanoids with orange scaly skin from the planet Arden. They are represented by the deceased Green Lanterns Lodar and Meeno Monak.

Astonians
The Astonians are a minor alien race under a once dying star saved by the Blue Lantern Saint Walker upon facing extinction. Saint Walker is of this race.

Azarathians
The Azarathians are people belonging to the parallel universe of Azarath. Raven is an Azarathian.

B

Barrions
The Barrions of Barrio III are silicon-based lifeforms. They are represented by the Green Lantern known as Chaselon.

Bellatrix Bombers
The Bellatrix Bombers are alien warlords featured in Green Lantern (vol. 3) #20.

Bgztlians
The Bgztlians are humans who share the same metahuman talent, the ability to become intangible. Bgztl is an ancient colony of Earth. Phantom Girl of the Legion of Super-Heroes is their representative.

Blight
The Blight are a cybernetic race whose bodies are composed of rotting flesh from Legion of Super-Heroes.

Bloodline Parasites
The eight Bloodline Parasites were extraterrestrial lifeforms capable of accidentally activating the human metagene during the act of feeding on human spinal fluid. All Parasites had dense exoskeletons and were incredibly strong, they all had the ability to duplicate human form.

Braalians
The Braalians are humans who share the same metahuman talent, the ability to manipulate local electromagnetic fields. They reside on the ancient Earth colony of Braal. Cosmic Boy and Magno of the Legion of Super-Heroes are their representatives.

Brain-Parasites of Planet X
The Brain-Parasites of Planet X hail from Planet X and use powerful Knowledge-Extractors to steal knowledge from other races.

Branx
The Branx of Emana Branx are a gray-skinned race of dull-witted, four-armed warriors who serve the Citadelians. Native to the Vega star system.

Brylyx
The Brylyx are white-skinned aliens featured in Green Lantern: Mosaic.

The Bolovax Vikians
The Bolovax Vikians are highly communal and technologically advanced Bolovax Vikians of Bolovax Vik are a dead race. Kilowog of the Green Lantern Corps is the last surviving member of this species.

Bugs of New Genesis
The Bugs of New Genesis are an insectoid race who were spread on New Genesis during their war with Apokolips. They are a society of humanoid bugs that thrive in colonies beneath the surface of the planet. There is occasionally prejudice between these two races, as many of the gods consider the bug-people to be a lesser species. Forager and Mantis are the most prominent members of the race.

C

Cairnians
The Cairnians are members of L.E.G.I.O.N.

Calatonians
The Calatonians are an ancient monarchy on the planet Calaton ravaged by the Doomsday creature.

Canopians
The Canopians are a member of Atari Force. Canopians such as Morphea are from New Earth in a parallel universe.

Carggites
The Carggites are humans who share the same metahuman talent, the ability to triplicate themselves. They come from the ancient Earth colony of Cargg. Triplicate Girl of the Legion of Super-Heroes is their representative.

Catherix

The Cathexis are a race of alien super-scientists from the "sixth dimension" who created self-aware reality endangering technology.

Changralynians
The Changralynians of Changralyn are a race of silicon-based pacifists, they are represented by Broot of the Omega Men.

Chietain

Children of Tanjent
The Children of Tanjent are a psionic race.

Circadians
The peaceful insectoid Circadians of Circadia established a joint human/Circadian settlement in the 30th Century known as Pax Colony. The best known Circadian representative is Circadia Senius, a Chronarch Research Fellow at the Metropolis Time Institute and a friend of Brainiac 5.

Chthalonians

Citadelians
The Citadelians of the Citadel are a race of sadistic imperialistic clones, whose intellect and genetic viability degrades with each newly cloned generation. The former tyrant rulers of the Vega star system are now an Empire in decline. The Citadelians use Gordanians and Branx Warriors as their enforcers; they have a limited mastery of Psion technology.

Clementians
The Clementians of Clementia are also known as "Black Mercies". The Green Lantern known as Mother Mercy is the caretaker and ruler of the Clementian race.

Coluans
The Coluans of Colu are a pretercognitive species, one of the most technologically advanced in the known universe. They are most notably represented by the various men and women who hold the title of Brainiac.

Competalians
The Competalians of Competalia are a race of people empowered by the discovery of their equivalent of the metagene. They recently overthrew the tyrant known as Anathema. They are similar in concept to the Inhumans from Marvel Comics.

Controllers
The Controllers are a Maltusin descended race, cousins of similar offshoot races such as the Oans and Zamarons.

Council of Overseers
The Council of Overseers are a trio of aliens that somehow got hold of Warworld until they handed it over to Mongul.

Criq
The Criq are the presumed name of  a grey skinned humanoid species with wide eyes from a planet of the same name. They are represented by the now deceased Green Lantern Driq.

Cthistosians
The Cthistosians are the presumed name of a species of red skinned humanoid amphibians that apparently secreted an aroma that was unpleasant to humans. They are represented by the deceased Green Lantern Chthos-Chthas Chthatis.

Culacaons
The Culacaons of Culacao are a strange example of a deliberately engineered lifeform. The Culacaon sexes exhibit wildly separate phenotypes, with the yellow-skinned males being humanoid and the females being mollusc-like. The females have a sensitive membrane in their shells that, when stabbed by the males, causes the females to become dormant and undergo mitosis; newborn males are then cut out of the newly budded section.

C'ythonisians
The C'ythonisians are the presumed name of a simian species from the planet C'ythonis. The deceased Green Lantern Myrrt was a member of this species.

Czarnians
The Czarnians are a critically endangered race of red-eyed, white-skinned humanoids. A peaceful and educated species, the Czarnians were all but wiped out when one of their own - Lobo - decimated their homeworld of Czarnia as part of a "high school science experiment" gone wrong. While their attributes differ between continuities, Czarnians - by way of Lobo - are mostly depicted as exhibiting super strength and durability coupled with accelerated healing. Lobo's most prolific trait is his ability to create clones of himself with only a few drops of blood.

D

Daxamites
The Daxamites are a race who originate from the planet Daxam, with physiology similar to Kryptonians. This enables them to gain special abilities in a yellow-sun environment, yet they have extreme sensitivity to lead.

Debstams
The Debstams of Debstam IV are a race of humanoids who were wiped out by a pandemic brought to their world by the tyrant Mongul.

Dheronians
The Dheronians are a race of white-eyed, white-skinned humanoids introduced in the Earth One continuity. Hailing from Dheron, the fifth world of the Rao star system, the Dheronians were locked in an ongoing war for resources with the neighboring world of Krypton and had a hand in the planet's fate. As they share the same star as Krypton, their physiology functions in much the same way with only several notable differences; absorbing energy from foreign stars to exhibit super strength and invulnerability. While still strong, their technology is still vulnerable to Krypton's.

Dhorians
The Dhorians of Dhor are one of four technologically advanced and constantly at war spacefaring races native to the Antares system. The infamous Kanjar Ro is Dhorian. Dhorians have large insectlike compound eyes and prominently pointed noses.

Diibs
The Diibs are a race of massive and nearly indestructible denizens of Diibworld, home of L.E.G.I.O.N. member Bertron Diib.

Djinn
The Djinn are race of alien warriors who tried to invade Oa led by Kantuu.

Doda
The Doda are a race of aliens in the 30th century.

Dominators

The Dominators of the Dominion are a race of conquerors who destroy what they cannot dominate. Their mastery of advanced science, specifically the "metagene", rivals the talents of the Psions.

Dokris
The Dokris are a race of green-skinned aliens with advanced time travel technology; they altered Earth's past to invade and conquer the planet in the year 2287. They were defeated by Kid Flash (Wally West).

Draal
The Draal are alien invaders of Sector 3515.

Dromedanians
The Dromedanians are a camel-like humanoid race native to the 30th Century. Captain Brakta, an ally of the Legion of Super-Heroes, hails from Dromedania.

Dryad
The Dryads are a race of silicon-based lifeforms, represented by Strata and Blok.

Duomalians
The Duomalians are a race of gray-skinned humanoids who inhabit the "Mirror World", a fourth dimensional universe also inhabited by the Amazonlike Orinocas. Duomal was discovered and renamed by Giovanni Zatara, in honor of its co-rulers Queen Duora and Queen Mulano. Duomal was originally known as Thrule.

Durlans
The Durlans are an infamous and much-feared race of xenophobic shapeshifters native to the planet Durla. Chameleon Boy and Chameleon Girl of the Legion of Super-Heroes are their representatives. The Legion of Super-Heroes' financier R. J. Brande was also a Durlan who was trapped in human form due to the deadly Yorggian fever.

Dyrlians
The Dyrlians of Dyrlia are an orange-skinned humanoid alien race who sent their genetically engineered savior the "Star-Child" to Earth, so that he could be raised by Superman and Supergirl. The Star-Child matured into an adult in twenty-four hours.

E

Earthlings
The Earthlings are the names given to the inhabitants of the planets Earth. The dominant life form on the planet are Human, a species of bipedal sapient beings with varying hues of skin. They have the genetic potential to gain amazing powers thanks to the Meta-Gene. They have also split into sub-species such as the Atlanteans and the Amazons.

Empire of Tears
The Empire of Tears is an alien empire on the prison planet Ysmault.

En'tarans
The En'tarans are a race of would-be conquerors who decimated much of Rann in their quest to acquire Zeta-Beam technology.

Euphorians
The Euphorians are a race of telepathic and telekinetic humanoids from the planet Euphorix in the Vega star system. They are represented by Primus and Kalista of the Omega Men.

Exorians
The Exorians are aliens from the planet Exor. They are represented by a pair of Exorian metas named Zan and Jayna (the Wonder Twins), two of the ten hereditary protectors of Exor. The "Ten Elements of the Universe" is the name given to a group of five pairs of royal twins on Exor, each pair possesses elemental powers including fire, love, vapors, plants, sound, metal, and shadows.

F

Farfarmniflatch
The Farfarmniflatch are a race of shapeshifters. Monstergirl of the Young Heroes has been revealed to be one of them.

Femiazons
The Femiazons are a race from Trigus VIII.

Fire People
The Fire People are alien beings of living fiery plasma, who arrive on a comet. They are defeated by the Justice Society of America.

Flame Men
The Flame Men were extraterrestrials fire people, that seemed to be made of, or at least able to project thermokinetic energy.

Fluvians
The Fluvians of the planet Fluvian are a form of aquatic plant-based life. Dob Zagil of Fluvian later became a Green Lantern.

Freshishs
The Fresishs of Fresish are a race of insectoids. Gorgoth of Fresish is a member of the Dark Circle.

Futuresmiths

Fylipians
The Fylipians are the presumed name of a species from planet Fylip in Sector 2813. Tammal Tayn of the Orange Lantern Corps is a member of this race.

G

G'Newtians
The G'Newtians are a race of humanoid canines. G'nort is a member of this race.

Galadorians
The Galadorians of Galador have lifespans measured in tens of thousands of years, and have power over matter and energy. Bed Aldain of Galador is their representative on Earth where he works as a shepherd in fields just outside Metropolis.

Garonese
The Garonese of Garon are human-like aliens under the control of the Headmen.

Garrians
The Garrians are the presumed name of a snake-like race from the planet Garr. A Red Lantern Corps member of this race was seen in a possible future where Guy Gardner became a Blue Lantern.

Giants of Dimension Zero
The Giants of Dimension Zero are a technologically advanced, extra-dimensional species discovered by Green Arrow and his sidekick Speedy. They also meet Xeen Arrow, an alternate version of Green Arrow native to Dimension Zero.

Giants of Ogyptu
The Giants of Ogyptu are blue-skinned nude giants on the planet Ogyptu in the Vega star system. Time appears to pass much slower for them than other species, and they are, for all intents and purposes, immortal.

Gil'Dishpan
The Gil'Dishpan are the oldest and most powerful, imperialistic, spacefaring, aquatic extraterrestrial race in the DC Comics Universe. They appear to be purple giant tube worms, and are powerful telepaths. The Gil'Dishpan have taken an interest in younger aquatic races such as the Hykraians, the Qarians and the Atlanteans of Earth. The Gil'Dishpan were responsible for uplifting the Hykraians and giving them the gift of interstellar travel. Their homeworld is a frozen planet with methane oceans similar to the lakes of Titan.

Glazzonions
The Glazzonions are a race of grey skinned humanoids with flat, almost snout like faces and no noses. The deceased Green Lantern Ahtier was a member of this race.

Glirell
The Glirell are the presumed name of a near-human species of pacifists from a planet of the same name. They are represented by the deceased Green Lantern Jeryll.

Gordanians
The Gordanians are a race of reptilian alien slavers who have colonized the planet Karna and served the Citadel; enemies of the Karnans, the native werefeline race which they hunted to near-extinction.

Gordanians in other media
 The Gordanians appear in the Justice League episode "Starcrossed". They are mentioned to be at war with the Thanagarians. They later appear in the Justice League Unlimited episode "Hunter's Moon". Following their failed invasion of Earth, Hro Talak's army was ambushed by the Gordanians and he bought his remaining army time to get away.
 The Gordanians appear in the Batman: The Brave and the Bold episode "Mystery in Space!". The Gordanian army led by General Kreegaar (voiced by Richard Green) has attempted many times to conquer Rann only to be thwarted by Adam Strange. In the episode "Duel of the Doublecrossers", a Gordanian trooper (voiced by James Arnold Taylor) was apprehended by Jonah Hex to fight on Warworld where it was beaten many times by Steppenwolf.

Graxions
The Graxions are an elf-like race from Space Sector 2815, located near the constellation Gemini. Green Lantern Arisia Rrab is a member of the species.

Grendians
The Grendians are robotic beings capable of self-awareness and emotion. Stel of the Green Lantern Corps hails from Grenda.

Griks
The Griks are a race of amphibian spacefaring roboticists who are allies of Rann; they were contracted to use their robots in Rann's mines.

Grolls
The Grolls are alien invaders with cerebro-radiation rays.

Gryxians
The Gryxians are a yellow-skinned humanoid race from Gryx. Stealth from L.E.G.I.O.N. was a member of this race and was cast out of her society because she was born with special powers.

Guardians of the Clockwork Universe
The Guardians of the Clockwork Universe are a mysterious group that once recruited Captain Comet in their goals in protecting "the Clockwork Universe"(not to be confused with the Oan Guardians).

H

H'od
The H'od are 'would be' galactic conquerors.

H'San Natall

The H'San Natall Empire is the home of a powerful warrior race, which forced a group of captive Psion scientists to create superhuman hybrids of the human and H'San Natall races. These four hybrid children later joined the Teen Titans.

H'tros
The H'tros are a mechanical race who seeks destruction of all organic life, and aided the Cyborg Superman in capturing Superman.

Halla's
The Halla's are a race of green-skinned aliens from Sector 2814, they wore purple and black uniforms with no insignia. The Halla's served as enforcers for the Oans in the transition period between the Manhunters and the Green Lantern Corps. Instead of power rings the Halla's were given the stun guns and power batteries of the Manhunters.

Havanians
The Havanians of Havania consists of two races, the angelic upper class and the frog-like lower class. Bleez of the Red Lantern Corps is a Havanian.

Hators
The Hators are from the ruined planet Hator. Badra is the only survivor of her kind and is an enemy of Wonder Woman.

Headmen
The Headmen are alien leaders whom often refer themselves to their psychic abilities of superior intelligence and enhanced telepathy; they hail from the Vegan star system.

Hegemony
The Hegemony are an alien race of toxic world invaders who pollute planets for bio-chemicals and other resources.

Hexapuses
The Hexapuses of Vortuma are a race of six-legged intelligent purple cephalopods encountered by Aquaman. He was transported to their world by technology similar to the Zeta-Beams used by Adam Strange. The Hexapuses communicate using vibrations through water; their word for water is "Vortum". They have advanced communications technology, and can focus aquatic vibrations around their tentacles to create "water tornadoes".

Htraeans
The Htraeans of the topologically impossible planet Htrae are also known as Bizarros. Like Bizarro, their lifestyle is backwards.

Hykraians
The Hykraians are amphibious telepaths from the water world of Hykraius. Tellus, a member of the Legion of Super-Heroes, is their representative.

I

Icoids
The Icoids are former natives of Jupiter's moons, who later moved to the rings of Saturn. They and the Thermoids originated outside the Solar System.

Imperiex Probes
The Imperiex Probes make up the body of a hive-intelligence led by a cosmic being known as Imperiex.

Imskians
The Imskians are humans who share the same metahuman talent, the ability to shrink. They come from the ancient Earth colony Imsk. Shrinking Violet of the Legion of Super-Heroes is their representative.

Invisible Raiders
The Invisible Raiders are a race of yellow-skinned Saturnians with abilities similar to the Faceless Hunter.

J

Jaquaans
Little is known of the Jaquaans of the planet Jaquaa. Their sole representative in the 30th Century is Doctor Gym'll, the staff doctor of the Legion of Super-Heroes.

Jayd
The Jayd are a purple skinned race of humanoids from a planet of the same name. They were represented by disgraced and deceased Green Lanterns Kentor and Laira Omoto.

Jirenn
The Jirenn are a humanoid race from Rojira which represent the Green Lantern Rori Dag.

Junoans
The Junoans of the asteroid Juno are a race of technologically advanced humanoid aliens. The Junoans are protected by an Atlantean exile named Zarl Vorne who gained Kryptonian-equivalent abilities when in close proximity to the asteroid.

K

Kahloans
The Kahloans are the indigenous people of the planet Kahlo. Many Kahloans are addicted to Belamort, a psychotropic plant.

Kalanorians
The Kalanorians of Kalanor are a purple-skinned, two-eyed race of alien soldiers and sorcerers whose greatest champions are three-eyed mutants empowered by the "Flame of Py'tar". Their current champion and king is the tyrant Despero.

Kalvars
The Kalvars of Kalvar are also known as the "Bird-Man Bandits". They are a species of purple-skinned telepathic humanoids with bird-like wings and feet.

Karnans
Karna was the home of a races of extraterrestrial werecats known as the Karnans who shared their world with the Gordanians, who hunted them to near-extinction. The only surviving Karnan is Tigorr of the Omega Men.

Khund

The Khunds are an ancient warrior race from the heavy gravity world of Khundia. Khunds have codified rules of combat. Khund bodies have much denser bone and muscle tissue than humans.

Kriglo
The Kriglo are a race of spider-men native to the planet Mars. The Kriglo have large black spider-like bodies with bald human-like faces, green skin, large fangs, and prehensile green-skinned hands on their forelegs. They called the planet Mars 'Kigor'. Their relation to the other Martians is unknown.

Klaramarians
The Klaramarians of Klaramar are a race of yellow-skinned Saturnians possibly descended from the Yellow Martians. Klaramarians all appear to have yellow-orange skin, pointy ears, a total lack of facial features, and are telepaths. The Faceless Hunters are known to be Klaramarians.

Karaxians

Korugarians
The Korugarians of Korugar are a superstitious high technology race. They are represented by Thaal Sinestro, Katma Tui, and Soranik Natu.

Krells
The Krells of New Krell are blue-skinned, wrinkly, coneheaded aliens, who live on a Superman-shaped generation ship they call New Krell.

Krenons
The Krenons are a species of alien brutes and hybrids who have an interest in Almeracian society. Most Krenons are genetically engineered with four arms. Sazu and the warlord De'cine are from this race, but Sazu is created from a slave caste system and is regarded as a hybrid species.

Krokodilos
The Krokodilos are a warlike empire which hails from Krokodilo Prime in the Byo system.

Kroloteans

The Kroloteans of Krolote are a high technology race also known as "Gremlins". They perform illegal genetic experiments on other species and sell the resulting bio-weapons to their clients.

Kryptonians

The Kryptonians are the alien inhabitants of the destroyed planet Krypton. They are represented on Earth by Superman, Supergirl, the Kandorians, and General Zod and his fellow Phantom Zone inmates.

Kwai
The Kwai are a race of insectoids from the Second Galaxy, a quadrant of the Legion Universe. Legion member Shikari is a Kwai.

L

Lallorans
The Lallorans – The Lallorans are humans, some of whom possess metahuman talents, from the ancient Earth colony of Lallor. Their representatives are the Heroes of Lallor.

Largas
The Largas are an extremely peaceful race that watched over Warworld after the Warzoons were wiped out. The Largas eventually died out too.

Laroo
The Laroo are a race of religiously fanatical aliens who persecuted the Lasma.

Lartnecs
The Lartnecs are a blue-skinned humanoid race. Star Sapphires member Miri Riam hails from Lartnec.

Lasma
The Lasma (also known as the Ayrie) are a peaceful race of plant-like cosmic beings.

Lenglyns

Lexorians
The Lexorians of Lexor are a race of humanoid aliens who believed that Lex Luthor was a hero and that Superman was a villain (they found out that Luthor was really a villain a little too late). Later, Luthor accidentally destroyed the planet while fighting Superman. Luthor, however, irrationally blamed Superman for Lexor's destruction.

Lizarkons
The Lizarkons are one of the subject races of the Thanagarian Empire. Their pre-conquest homeworld is located in the Aptilia solar system, a distinction they share with the Manhawks. Their representative is Isamot Kol.

Llarans
The Llarans of Llar are one of four technologically advanced and constantly at war spacefaring races native to the Antares system. The most well known Llaran is their ruler, Emperor Sayyar. The Llarans are reptilian humanoids.

Lunarians
The Lunarians of Planet Prime are a race of yellow-skinned humanoids who lived in a hollow world complete with an artificial sun, inside of Earth's moon Luna. The Lunarians intended to wipe out humanity to expand their empire using their "molecular disruption technology" and "cephalic inhibitors". They are ruled by a government called the Diode, led by Primor-Trena and the Secundus-Ormang. Lunarian molecular disruption weaponry operates in the same spectrum as "red sun radiation" and can theoretically kill Superman. Like Kryptonians, the Lunarians can absorb solar radiation to become superhumanly powered. The Lunarians were forcibly exiled to an artificial planetoid (generation ship), and banished from the Solar System by Superman. The status of their former home inside the hollow Moon is unknown.

M

Macrolatts
The Macrolatts are a tyrant race that enslaved the Zarolatts.

Maltusians
The Maltusians were the progenitors of three of the galaxy's oldest alien societies, the Oans, the Zamarons, and the Controllers. It was on Maltus that the Guard-Power later wielded by the Oans was first discovered.

Manhawks
The Manhawks are one of the subject races of the Thanagarian Empire; they are large hawk-like avians who wear humanoid masks. Their nameless pre-conquest homeworld is located in the Aptilia solar system, a distinction they share with the Lizarkons.

Manhunters

The Manhunters are sentient berserker androids, originally created as a force for peace by the Oans until they went rogue. The Manhunters were the prototype for a later group of more controllable robotic enforcers created by the Guardians; these machines were known as the "Fists of the Guardians".

Margoi
The Margoi are orange-skinned aliens with forehead crests and blue eyes. The Margoi are at war with the Aloi over a device known as the "Grayl". The Margoi are represented by Nemmul.

Martians

The Martians are the native humanoid species of the planet Mars, known for their incredible psychic powers and shapeshifting abilities. They are split among four ethnic/racial divisions: the Green Martians, represented on Earth by the Martian Manhunter; the Red Martians; the White Martians (aka "Pole Dwellers"), led by the warlord Commander Blanx; and the Yellow Martians.

Metans
The Metans are natives of the Meta-Zone are able to pass through the Zero-Zone using M-Vests to access Earth. Meta is the home of Rac Shade, also known as Shade, the Changing Man.

Molantans

Monguls
The Monguls are the unnamed alien race of technologically advanced, religious fanatics from which the tyrant Mongul was exiled. Mongul was deposed during a revolution led by an ancient mystic known as the Arkymandryte; he fled the theological coup with a small trusted crew whom he later killed.

Monitors

The Monitors are a group of ancient cosmic beings from a vast alien civilization who ruled the DC Multiverse for billions of years.

Monks
The Monks are a race of squirrel or chipmunk-like aliens from the planet H'lven. Ch'p and Bd'g of the Green Lantern Corps are Monks.

Moon Creatures

Mosteelers
The Mosteelers of Mosteel are one of four technologically advanced and constantly at war spacefaring races native to the Antares system. The most well known Mosteeler is their ruler, the metal-skinned Kromm. The Mosteelers are not robots, but their metabolism appears to have deposited ferrous metals directly into their protective chitinous exoskeletons.

Muscarian
The Muscarian are a race of small, sentient, vaguely humanoid fungi. Amanita of the Green Lantern Corps is a member of this race.

Mygorg
The Mygorg are a brutish green-skinned race which has enslaved the human population of the planet Pytharia, including that planet's ruling elite the Lightning Lords. Pytharia is the extradimensional home of the swordswoman known as Starfire.

Myrmitons
The Myrmitons are the blue-skinned rulers of the Myrmiton Star Empire; they attempted a secret invasion of Earth which was foiled by Green Lantern and the Flash.

N

N'crons
The N'crons of N'cron are a race of tentacled aliens who closely resemble H.P. Lovecraft's depiction of Cthulhu. Grullug Garkush of N'cron is a member of the Dark Circle.

Naltorians
The Naltorians are humans who share the same metahuman talent, the power of precognition. They come from the ancient Earth colony Naltor. Nura Nal and Mysa Nal of Naltor are members of the Legion of Super-Heroes and are their representatives, while Norak Kun of Naltor is a member of the Dark Circle.

Naktosian
The Naktosians are a race of grey skinned humanoids from the planet Naktos. They live their lives according to a strict set of laws. They are represented by deceased Green Lanterns Ghrelk and Varix.

New Gods

The New Gods are virtually immortal race of deified humanoids originating from a plane of existence known as the Fourth World and centered on the conflicting planets of New Genesis and Apokolips. The two warring factions are led by the benign Highfather and the ruthless Darkseid respectively. In addition to each planet possessing their own sophisticated technology unique to the two cultures, the New Gods almost innately exhibit super strength and durability. Some may have influence over domains of power such as emotion or energies like the Alpha Effect or Omega Beams.

Noc'Sagians
The Noc'Sagians are a race of beings with enormous heads that comprise most of their body mass. They have three legs to help support this great cranium, and their arms emerge from the sides of their face. They are represented by deceased Green Lanterns Gallius Zed and Cundiff Cood, as well as a new unnamed Noc'Sagian Green Lantern.

Null-Oids
The Null-Oids represented by Null-O are artificial beings made of neither matter nor energy. Null-O was sent from the distant future by advanced humans.

O

Oans
The Oans are a Maltusian descended race, cousins of similar offshoot races such as the Zamarons and Controllers. They are also known as the "Guardians of the Universe".

Obsidian Folk
The Obsidian Folk are one of two races native to Stoneworld; they are obsidian-skinned, hairless, tribal humanoids. Kworri of the Obsidian Folk later became a Green Lantern.

Octi-Apes
The Octi-Apes are a race of sentient aliens that resemble six-armed gorillas. They are represented by Kar-Han who was temporarily stranded on Earth.

Okaarans
The Okaarans of Okaara are the second oldest race in the Vega star system. The Warlords of Okaara studied and perfected all forms of combat to protect the once peaceful Okaarans from the Psions.

Okaarans in other media
The Warlords of Okaara appear in the Batman: The Brave and the Bold episode "When OMAC Attacks". Batman alongside Hawk and Dove had to stop a war between the Controllers and the Warlords of Okaara.

Olys
The Olys are alien invaders of numerous star systems.

Omegons
The Omegons of Omegon are a race of purple-skinned, four-armed humanoids with a hybrid feudal/technological culture. The murdered hero "Voltro the Champion" was born on Omegon.

Omerons
The Omerons hail from the planet Omeron orbiting the star-sun Antares. Discovered by a human farmer named Howard Melville who piloted a crashed Omeron ship back to its homeworld.

Ophidians
The Ophidians are a secret mystic race.

Orandans
The Orandans of Orando are possibly descendants of the Homo magi of Earth. Princess Projectra and Sensor of the Legion of Super-Heroes are their representatives.

Orinocas
The Orinocas are a race of telepathic warrior women who inhabit the "Mirror World", a fourth dimensional universe also inhabited by the Duomalians. The first person from Earth to discover the Mirror World was Giovanni Zatara, but it was Samuel Scudder, the original Mirror Master, who discovered the Orinocans.

Overlords
The Overlords are a cybernetic lunar race.

P

Parademons

The Parademons are a race of alien shocktroopers commanded by Darkseid.

Peganans
The Peganans are a fish-like race which tried to invade Earth in the 25th century. The name of the species is a possible textual reference to The Gods of Pegāna, by Lord Dunsany.

Pharmans
The Pharmans are a species of blue-skinned humanoids. They are represented by the deceased Green Lantern Davo Yull.

Pharoids
The Pharoids are the rulers of the Pharon Empire. They hail from the planet Pharos IV.

Poglachians
The Poglachians are a race of alien clowns.

Progeny
The Progeny are a beetle-like race in the Second Galaxy who want to eliminate the creation of Element Lad's race the Kwai.

Prolfs
The Prolfs are a race of diminutive aliens who are immune to the vacuum of space. They are native to the Vega star system.

Promethean Giants
The Promethean Giants are an ancient alien race of giants that are trapped in The Source Wall.

Proteans
The Proteans are a race of telepathic shapeshifting pets from an unnamed planet in the Antares system. Proty I (deceased) and Proty II (a member of the Legion of Super-Pets) are their representatives.

Psion

The Psions are a race of reptilian scientists uplifted by Maltusian proto-Oans from native Maltusian lizards.

Puffballs
The Puffballs are an intergalactic hive of Green Lanterns.

Pumice People
The Pumice People are one of two races native to Stoneworld, they are dark gray-skinned, hairless, tribal humanoids. Aa of the Pumice People later became a Green Lantern.

Pytharians
The Pytharians are a race from the planet Pytharia which is the extradimensional homeworld of the swordswoman known as Starfire. The planet was once ruled by an elite class known as the Lightning Lords, but the human population has been enslaved by aliens known as the Yorg and the Mygorg.

Q

Quahooga

Qarians
The Qarians of Qaria are aquatic humanoids who closely resemble humans, but have purple coral-like hair and gills on the backs of their necks. Qaria is a world completely covered in water.

Qinoori Raiders
The Qinoori Raiders are a race of raiders who strip mine planets for resources. Zamba, homeworld of the Darkstar Ferrin Colos was destroyed by them.

Quantum Mechanics
The Quantum Mechanics are a superadvanced alien race.

Qwardians
The Qwardians are natives of the planet Qward in the anti-matter universe. Qward is the anti-matter equivalent of the planet Oa.

R

Rannians
The Rannians of Rann are an ancient race of technologically advanced humanoids. They are represented by Alanna Strange, wife of Adam Strange and her father Sardath; formerly located in the Alpha Centauri star system, they are currently located in the Polara star system.

Rannians in other media
The Rannians appear in Batman: The Brave and the Bold, Young Justice, Krypton and Lego DC Comics Super Heroes: Justice League: Cosmic Clash.

Ravagers of Olys

Red-Moon Gods
The Red-Moon Gods are Atlantean survivors of the city of Challa-Bel-Nalla, then ruled by Lord Daamon (an ancestor of Deimos), formed an alliance with an alien race they called the Red-Moon Gods. These aliens provided the Atlanteans with advanced technology that Travis Morgan, a.k.a. the Warlord, would later discover in New Atlantis.

Reflektorrs
The Reflektorrs are a race of psionic parasites consisting of pure psychic energy; they were discovered feeding on natives of Apokolips.

Replikons

Reach
The Reach are an ancient militaristic race who control Space Sector 2; they have an ancient non-aggression pact with the Oans, and are the creators of Jaime Reyes' (Blue Beetle) scarab. They are also the second oldest race in the universe behind the Maltusians.

Reach in other media
The Reach appear as one of the main antagonists of the second season of Young Justice.

Rhoon
The Rhoon come from the planet Rhoon which is split between science and elemental sorcery, with magic users segregated to the Sorcerer's Isle. They are represented by Green Lantern Hollika Rahn.

Rigellians
The Rigellians are a violet-skinned, four-armed race of noseless amphibians who fled their own dying world untold years in the future. They were welcomed by humans living on Earth in a time when the sun appeared to have become a red giant. A civil war takes place when the Halflings, the hybrid offspring of humans and the Rigellians, overthrow their forefathers.

Roboticans
The Roboticans of Robotica are a machine civilization led by C.O.M.P.U.T.O. which is native to the 30th Century.

Roguians
The Roguians are a shy race from the planet Rogue in the Vega star system. Soon after birth, they learn to produce a natural force shield that hides them even from each other. Elu of the Omega Men is a Roguian.

Rolvacians
The Rolvacians are the presumed name of a mammalian race with orange skin and long ears that engage in seasonal hibernation. They are represented by the deceased Green Lantern Burkett.

Rulanns
The Rulanns are one of two races from Rojira which resemble starfish.

S

Sangtee
The Sangtee are members of the single-sex Sangtee Empire, ruled by an Emperor called the "Kreel".

Saturnians
The Red, White, and Yellow Saturnians are descended from clones of the Green, White, and Yellow Martians. Fura, a Saturnian warlord from 3000 A.D., appeared in Batman #26, an enemy of the Batman of 3000 A.D. Jemm is also a Saturnian.

Savothians
The Savothians are a camel-like advanced humanoid species native to the planet Savoth. They have entertained a long friendship with all members of the Flash Family.

Scissormen
The Scissormen are metafictional characters who inhabit a world called Orqwith.

Scyllans
The Scyllans are the presumed name of a sentient race from the planet Scylla. They are spindly and thin, and are represented by the deceased Green Lantern Laham.

Sklarians
The 'Sklarians from the planet Sklar are a yellow-skinned humanoid race. They are represented by the Sklarian Raiders and Kono of the Legion of Super-Heroes.

Slaggites
The Slaggites (also known as Spitroids) from the planet Slagg survived a near-genocide after they rebelled against Citadel rule, represented by Shlagen of the Omega Men.

Slyggians
The Slyggians are the four-armed native sentient race of the planet Slyggia, these intelligent reptillian aliens are represented by Salakk of the Green Lantern Corps and Smythwick of the Sinestro Corps.

Sornaii
The Sornaii are an apparently multiversally aware alien race who seem to serve a role similar to that of the Monitors, but on a lesser scale.

Space Dolphins
The Space Dolphins are alien cetaceans capable of surviving and navigating in the vacuum of outer space. Two Space Dolphins have been seen in the company of Lobo.

Spider Guild
The Spider Guild are a race of alien merchants, traders, slavers and conquerors from the Vega star system.

Sputans
The Sputans are a sentient race made up of larva and bacteria.

Star Conquerors
The Star Conquerors are starfish-like aliens that are speculated to be Starro's race.

Statejians
The Statejians are a warlike race of Qualar IV.

Suirpalamians
The Suirpalamians are the presumed name of a species of sentient primates from the planet Suirpalam. They are represented by the deceased Green Lantern B'Shi.

Sumal
The Sumal are an alien race exterminated by the Progeny located in the Progenitor's Galaxy.

T

Talokians
There are three known species of Talokians:
 The light blue-skinned natives of Talok III are Mikaal Tomas' (Starman) people.
 The sapphire blue-skinned natives of Talok IV are Lyssa Drak's people. Lyssa is a member of the Sinestro Corps.
 The dark blue-skinned natives of Talok VIII are Tasmia Mallor's (Shadow Lass) people. It is also the homeworld of her brother Grev Mallor, and her ancestors Lyrissa Mallor and Lydea Mallor.

Talyns
The Talyns of Talyn are an alien race represented by former Teen Titan Jarras Minion. The Talyns were the creators of the Omegadrone technology later co-opted by Victor Stone (Cyborg).

Tamaraneans
The Tamaraneans of Tamaran are a feline humanoid species native to the Vega star system. They have golden skin, large green catlike eyes, and long manelike hair. Like Superman and the residents of Krypton, the Tamaranians are living solar batteries who can store and convert solar radiation. They are represented by Starfire of the Teen Titans and Blackfire.

Tamaraneans in other media
The Tamaraneans appear in Teen Titans, Teen Titans Go! and Titans.

Tchk-Tchkii
The Tchk-Tchkii are a parasitic insectoid beetle-like race on the verge of extinction. Basically because of their yellow armor, they are responsible for the extermination of various Green Lantern Corps members from a few Space Sectors including Abin Sur.

Tebans

Technis
The Technis are a technologically savvy race who transformed Cyborg of the Teen Titans into Cyberion.

Technosapiens
The Technosapiens are a cybernetic parasite race which infects many different alien races.

Teiresiae
The Teiresiae are a race of shapeshifters who inhabit a land called Mother-Time.

Tellurians
The Tellurians of Telluria are blue-skinned Klingon-like aliens with red gems in their foreheads. The gems in their foreheads enable them to fire mind bolts. They are technologically advanced and are represented by the brothers Farlund and Karmault.

Terrorforms
The Terrorforms are a highly evolved telepathically synchronized race of beings who grant lower races superpowers.

Thanagarians
The Thanagarians of Thanagar are an ancient humanoid star empire orbiting the star Polaris. The Thanagarian Empire has contracted greatly since the days of the height of its power, but their descendants' many subject races still reside on the imperial homeworld. Gravity-defying wing harnesses made of an exotic material known as "Nth Metal" allow the Thanagarian elite, military and law enforcement to experience a unique form of powered flight. The Katar Hol version of Hawkman, Hawkgirl, Golden Eagle, and Fel Andar are known Thanagarians.

Thanagarians in other media
 The Thanagarians appear in the Justice League episode "Star-Crossed". While Hawkgirl's connection with the Thanagarians remains intact, the show features some exclusive Thanagarians like Hro Talek (voiced by Victor Rivers), Paran Dul (voiced by Elizabeth Peña), and Kragger (voiced by Héctor Elizondo). Hro Talek's forces show up on Earth to save them from a Gordanian ship. The Thanagarians offer to help Earth build a shield to defend against the invading Gordanians that the Thanagarians have been at war with, but Batman discovers that this is just a ruse. When the Thanagarians begin their invasion, Hawkgirl goes against her betrothed Hro Talek and helps the Justice League repel the Thanagarians.
 The Thanagarians appear in the Justice League Unlimited episode "Hunter's Moon". Following their failed invasion of Earth, Hro Talak's army was ambushed by the Gordanians and he bought his remaining army time to get away. After Hro Talek's sacrifice and landing on another planet, Paran Dul and Kragger lead the remnants of their Thanagarian forces in planning revenge on Hawkgirl on the unnamed planet.
 The TV series Naomi features a Thanagarian named Dee (portrayed by Alexander Wraith) who operates a local tattoo shop. Naomi McDuffie discovers this secret at the end of the first episode.

Thanagarian Snare Beasts
The Thanagarian Snare Beasts are giant spider-like aliens from the planet Thanagar. Kevin Smith's unproduced film Superman Lives was intended to include a monster called a "Thanagarian Snare Beast" which resembled an Earth spider. The monster was created to satisfy the demands of producer Jon Peters, who insisted that Superman battle a giant spider. Warner Bros. Entertainment, Inc. asked Smith to change its name to not refer to it as a spider.

Tharrians
The Tharrians are humans who share the same metahuman talent, the power of cold manipulation. They come from the ancient Earth colony Tharr. Polar Boy of the Legion of Super-Heroes is their representative.

Thermoids
The Thermoids are former natives of Jupiter's moons, who later moved to the rings of Saturn. They and the Icoids originated outside the Solar System.

Thorons
The Thorons of Thoron are a race of technologically advanced humanoids who hail from the same solar neighborhood as the Kryptonians, and possess similar abilities. They are represented by Halk Kar, a Thoron who once believed that he was "Superman's older brother".

Throneworlders
The Throneworlders are a race of humanoids who hail from Throneworld, a planet formerly known as Kranaltine. Throneworld is the home of Prince Gavyn, the hero known as Starman.

Thronnians
The Thronnians are a race of humanoids from the planet Thronn. Energiman, Magicko, Strong Girl, and Golden Blade are the Honor Team of Thronn.

Thythen
The Thythen are invaders of the planet Vonn and survivors of the planet Mars. They are warmongers who inhabit distant solar systems and use robotic chargers, gigantic robotic beings to help them invade other worlds.

Timronians

Titanians
The Titanians are humans who share the same metahuman talent, the power of telepathy. They come from an ancient colony on Saturn's moon Titan. Saturn Girl of the Legion of Super-Heroes is their representative.

Toomians
The Toomians are humanoids with wolf-like features. They are endangered because they are hunted for their valuable hides. Barreer Wot of the Green Lantern Corps is a Toomian.

Tormocks
The Tormocks are a race of humanoid culturally and psychologically primitive spacefaring warriors dedicated to the destruction of the Vuldarians. They are metamorphs who can change their shape and fuse with their armor or other inorganic properties to remake them into bio-mechanical apparatuses.

Tribunes
The Tribunes of Gallo are a race alleged to be even older than the Guardians of the Universe. They formed the Galactic Tribunal, an organization devoted to studying the immutable laws of creation, and dedicated to judging and punishing those who violate those laws. Led by Tribunal-Prime, with enforcers called the Tribunal Guardsmen.

Trogkian Mammoths
The Trogkian Mammoths are giant mammoth-like creatures whose stampedes terrorized the primitive world of Trogk. Moose of the Sinestro Corps is one of these creatures.

Trombusans
The Trombusans of Trombus are a race of humanoid aliens technologically and societally on par with Earth. Trombus is protected by the Hyper-Family, a group of humanoid aliens with Kryptonian-like abilities which they gained under a "red sun". The Hyper-Family are the only survivors of a nameless Krypton-like world. They are Hyperman, Hyperwoman, Hyperboy (Kirk Quentin), and Klypso the Hyperdog.

Trombusans in other media
Trombus was mentioned in the Supergirl episode "Truth, Justice and the American Way", and is where the former prison guard of Fort Rozz turned vigilante called the Master Jailer originates from.

Trontians
The Trontians are a race of amorphous amoeba-like aliens capable of joining into a collective biological mass. They also possess the ability to store large amounts of energy.

Trophy Lords
The Trophy Lords are a technologically advanced race of powerfully built, white-furred, wolf-like humanoids. They appear to be a race of pathological hunters and are represented by Jharaka Bin Dharlok. the Trophy Lord, who encountered Superman.

Tsaurons
The Tsaurons of Tsauron are a race of yellow-scaled reptilian humanoids. Ontiir of Tsauron is a member of the Dark Circle.

Tybaltians
The Tybaltians of Tybalt use Earth as a vacation spot by disguising their citizens as humans. In their natural forms, the Tybaltians are squat green-skinned dwarf-like creatures with enlarged craniums; they have exhibited physical strength on par with Superman.

Tynolans
The Tynolans are a race of orange-skinned humanoids. An alien deity named "Moxumbra the Star Serpent" had demanded living sacrifices from the Tynolans. The planet was destroyed by the alien entity known as Sraltka.

Tyrraazians
The Tyrrazians are a technologically advanced red-skinned race in the 30th Century who come from the artificial planetoid Tyrraz. The Tyrrazians have a strong physical and cultural resemblance to Khunds. They are represented by Tyr.

Tyreans
The Tyreans are a race of insectoids with long flat bodies and many flipper like legs. They are represented by the deceased Green Lantern Chogar

U

Ultas
The Ultas of Ulta appear to have their own version of the metagene. The hero "Trygg the Invincible" exhibited Superman-level strength before his death.

Ungarans
The Ungarans are red-skinned humanoids. They are represented by Abin Sur, the former Green Lantern of Sector 2814, and his son Amon Sur, who is now part of the Yellow Lanterns.

Uranians
The Uranians, led by Uvo the warlord of Uranus, sent a small space armada in a failed attempt to conquer the Earth and steal uranium, a radioactive ore which is abundantly present in the outer planets, only to be defeated by Wonder Woman. The Uranians have advanced technology and use a "decalcifying" ray which petrifies its victims.

Uxorians
The Uxorians are green-scaled reptilians from Uxor and are represented by the Green Man, former member of the Omega Men and the Green Lantern Corps.

V

Valeronians
The Valeronians are an extinct race of humanoid aliens due to the destruction of their planet Valeron. Vartox and Ontor are known Valeronians.

Varidians
The entire Varidian race was taken over by Starro. Astrild Storm-Daughter, goddess of her people, voluntarily submitted to Starro.

Varvans
The Varvans are a horned race of red-skinned humanoids from the planet Varva. They are represented by the deceased Green Lantern Ke'haan, and possibly Turytt.

Venusian Mind Worms
The Venusian Mind Worms are worms that did not originate in the Sol System, but were exiled to a prison capsule suspended in the upper atmosphere of Venus. When exposed to the rare element suspendium, Mind Worms will mutate into evolved forms known as Hyperflies. A Hyperfly is capable of feeding on the potentiality of the Multiverse. Mister Mind is the only Venusian Mind Worm.

Vimanians
The Vimanians are a humanoid alien race with three eyes and white hair who intended to stripmine the Earth. They brought along a workforce stored as energy matrices in special crystals; scientist Zachary Leight activated these crystals and they reconstituted as a group of heroes calling themselves the Xenobrood. The Vimanians were also responsible for creating the human metagene.

Vrangs
The Vrangs Vrang are a gray-skinned race of technologically advanced, space-faring warlike humanoids with batwings in place of ears. The Vrangs once tried to conquer the planet Krypton.

Vuldarians
The Vuldarians are a humanoid race of elite warriors with shapeshifting abilities similar to the Durlans. The Vuldarians can fashion their limbs into weapons as well as project internally generated energy into munitions. They also possess super strength and durability, enhanced healing, and flight. The Green Lantern Guy Gardner was born a Terran-Vuldarian hybrid - the first known case of a successful human-alien offspring of this species. However, his extraterrestrial gene was rendered dormant by means of genetic alteration, the full side-effects of which remain unrevealed.

Vulxans
The Vulxans are a race of orange-skinned silicon-based humanoids who developed advanced teleportation technology. Superboy discovered that Kryptonite could protect their planet from deadly radiation.

W

Wagnorians

Warworlders
When Warworld was destroyed upon its invasion of Earth with Brainiac, its inhabitants called the Warworlders went to Metropolis. To activate the remaining war machines, they went underground and took control of Metropolis's sewer system.

Warzoons
The Warzoons are a very warlike race that created Warworld. They all died off mysteriously.

Winathians
The Winathians come from the ancient Earth colony Winath. Their representatives are Lightning Lad and his twin sister Lightning Lass of the Legion of Super-Heroes and their brother Lightning Lord who all gained their abilities from the lightning beasts of Korbal.

Wingors
The Wingors are a race of winged gorillas from the planet Illoral which was conquered by Thanagar.

X

Xan
The Xan are living electromagnetic beings. They thrived in the earliest eras of Krypton.

Xanadorans
The Xanadorans are a humanoid race and home to Star Sapphires member Dela Pharon. Recently she has looked more alien, with darker skin and a more alien-like complexion.

Xanthuans

Xardans
The Xardans of Xarda are an amphibious race of purple-skinned humanoids. The deceased Green Lantern Ares Bandet was a member of this species.

Xenoformers
The Xenoformers from Galaxy X are Grant Morrison's bizarre meld of the Transformers and Scoop from Bob The Builder. Currently a Xenoformer named Metalek is imprisoned in Britain's Basement 101.

Xenusians
The Xenusians were a race of malevolent aliens who spread a mysterious plague that caused the victims to mutate and transforms into new Xenusians. The Xenusians were also responsible for the annihilation of the entire Vexaphon race.

Xudarians
The Xudarians of Xudar are an orange-skinned species of extraterrestrial pseudo-avians; reminiscent of ornithischians. Their most respected representatives are Tomar-Re, and his son Tomar-Tu of the Green Lantern Corps.

Y

Yazz
The Yazz are a bird-like alien race represented by the Yazz.

Yorg
The Yorg are a mysterious extradimensional race of living shadows who assisted another alien race known as the Mygorg with enslaving the Pytharians. The Lightning Lords were the ruling elite of Pytharia, home of the swordswoman known as Starfire. The Yorg were also closely allied with a sorceress named Lady Djinn. The Yorg exhibited shadow manipulation abilities similar to those of the Shadow Thief.

Z

Zambians
The Zambians are a race of humanoid people who had their planet destroyed by Qinoori raiders for minerals. Ferrin Colos joined the Darkstars after seeing his planet's destruction.

Zandrians
The Zandrians of Zandria are a race of would-be world conquerors incapable of harming sentient life.

Zamarons
The Zamarons are a Maltusian-descended race, cousins of similar offshoot races such as the Oans and the Controllers.

Zoans
The Zoans are the Green Lantern Gpaak's race.

Zarolatts
The Zarolatts are an energy race who were enslaved by the tyrannical Macrolatts. The Weird is a member of this race.

Zaroxians
The Zaroxians of Zarox-13 are a race of green-skinned rotund humanoids with advanced polymer science and robotics technology. The alien conqueror known as Garguax is a Zaroxian.

Zeerangans
The Zeerangans are a militaristic race that hail from the planet Zeeranga who attempted to conquer the planet Omeron.

Zilliphi
The Zilliphi are Taa's race.

Zolatams
The Zoltams of Zoltam are an advanced alien society with sound-based technology; they are also able to use sound to power their cities. Zoltams have light yellow skin, wide flat skulls, and pointed ears.

Zumoorians
The Zumoorians of Zumoor are a race of humanoids. The golden energy rays of Zumoor's moon appear to trigger the metagene in humans. Thomas Keith of Earth traveled to Zumoor with his dog Rovo, there he was adopted by Chad and Vela Kazzan and rechristened Zarl Kazzan. Somehow Zarl and his dog Rovo gained metahuman powers equal to a Kryptonian which they used to protect Zumoor.

Zwenties
The Zwenites inhabit the ancient Earth colony Zwen and have developed the ability to transform themselves into static stone forms to deal with the planet's exceptionally long rotation around its sun. Zwen's most famous native is Stone Boy, part of the Legion of Substitute Heroes.

See also
 List of Legion of Super-Heroes members
 List of alien races in Marvel Comics

References

External links
 List of Alien Races at the DCU Guide
 The Great Book of Oa at the Green Lantern Corps Web Page
 Cosmic Teams: The Omega Men
 Cosmic Teams: Legion of Super-Heroes

 
Extraterrestrial species and races by work
Alien races
Lists of fictional alien species